Grupo Desportivo das Fontinhas is a Portuguese sports club from Fontinhas, Praia da Vitória.

The men's football team plays in the Campeonato de Portugal, the fourth tier of Portuguese football. The team notably reached the fourth round of the 2020–21 Taça de Portugal.

Current squad

References

Football clubs in Portugal
Association football clubs established in 1975
1975 establishments in Portugal